The People's Liberation Army (PLA) has not always used ranks or insignia. In common with the practice of the Red Army at the time of its founding in 1927, neither were used until 1955 when a system of ranks was established. As a result of the Cultural Revolution, ranks were abolished in May 1965 (this led to a similar reform in Albania in the midst of the Albanian Cultural and Ideological Revolution). After the Sino-Vietnamese War of 1979, reforms in the PLA began to be made to professionalize the armed forces once more. The 1984 Military Service Law provided for the resumption of rank, but disagreements on what ranks were to be used and who would receive them caused the revival of rank to be delayed until 1988. The following ranks and their respective insignia shown are those used by the People's Liberation Army Ground Force.

Current ranking system

PLAGF officers 
The current system of officer ranks and insignia, a revision of the ranks and insignia established in 1955, began usage in 1988. The 1955 to 1965 marshal officer ranks of yuánshuài (5-star Marshal) and dà yuánshuài (6-star grand marshal) were not revived. The general officer ranks (jiang) were revised by the addition of semi-circular wreath at the bottom of the insignia and by a change in the name of the highest general officer rank from da jiang (4-star General) to yi ji shang jiang (4-star first class colonel general). This highest rank in the new system was never held and was abolished in 1994. The field officer (Xiao) and company officer (Wei) ranks were the same in title and insignia except that highest company-level officer rank of Da Wei in the 1955 to 1965 system was not included in the revived ranks. The final difference between the two systems is that in 1955 to 1965 there existed a warrant officer rank, Zhun Wei, which was not incorporated in the revived rank system, while new system had a rank for officer cadets, Xue Yuan. Despite being the rank below Shao Wei in both systems, the insignia have no similarities.

Officer rank names are usually not translated literally, but rather to a corresponding rank system. This can lead to different translations being used depending on the system chosen for the correspondences. The 1955–1965 system, with its greater number of officer ranks, is usually translated using the Soviet rank system of that era, while the modern officer ranks are usually given a NATO rank correspondence.  For example, the non-literal translation used for the rank of Shang Jiang (literally "senior general") depends on whether one is comparing it to Soviet or Russian ranks (colonel general) or to British or U.S. ranks (general).

PLAGF other ranks personnel 
The current system of other ranks and insignia dates from 2009.

Unlike NATO countries, new recruits of the People's Liberation Army have no military ranks before the boot camp is completed, and they will be awarded the rank of Private/Seaman Apprentice/Airman (All collectively called "Private" or "Lie Bing" in the Chinese Language) after they have graduated from the boot camp. According to Article 16 of Chapter 3 of the "Regulations on the Service of Active Soldiers of the Chinese People's Liberation Army", "The lowest enlisted rank is Private".

Other military branches 
The ranks of the People's Liberation Army Air Force generally has the same names, position and ranks as the People's Liberation Army Ground Force, and their insignia correspond except Air Force ranks are on a light blue background instead of green.

Ranks of the People's Liberation Army Navy also have corresponding insignia with a black background, but are only worn with the dress white uniforms, as only sleeve insignia are used in the dress blue uniform for officers, with other ranks retaining the shoulder board insignia.

Historic ranks

1955–65 rank system 
The PLA adopted ranks in 1955. The insignia used by officers from 1955 to 1965 by the PLA Ground Force were modelled on those used by the Soviet Army at the time and similar to the earlier Imperial Japanese Army on collar insignia, with the primary differences being the existence of an additional field officer rank, and the insignia of the highest general officer rank being four stars unlike the one large star used by the Soviet Armed Forces starting in 1963. The NCO insignia of that period showed Japanese influence with the use of stars on the collars with the specialty badge on the side. While general duties officers wore the shoulder board pattern shown below (gold and red), technical service officers sported white and red shoulder boards with their rank insignia. Ranks were abolished during the Cultural Revolution.

Timeline of change
Officer ranks

Other ranks

See also 
 Republic of China Army rank insignia
 Ranks and insignia of space forces

References

External links
PLA Uniforms and Insignia
Military ranks of the People's Liberation Army, on pre-2007 uniforms

People's Liberation Army
Military ranks of the People's Republic of China
People's Liberation Army